Strathfield railway station is a heritage-listed railway station located on the Main Suburban line in the Sydney suburb of Strathfield in the Municipality of Strathfield local government area of New South Wales, Australia. The station is served by Sydney Trains T1 North Shore & Western Line, T9 Northern Line and T2 Inner West & Leppington Line suburban services as well as NSW TrainLink Intercity and regional services. The station is located on the Main Northern and Main Western railway lines, forming a major junction for regional and suburban rail services. The station and associated infrastructure was added to the New South Wales State Heritage Register on 2 April 1999.

History

Strathfield suburb
This suburb, extending from Concord Plains to the Cooks River, was part of the area known (early in the colony) as Liberty Plains, so called because the first free settlers received grants there. James Wilshire received  in 1808 and called it Wilshire Farm - the grant lay between the present streets The Boulevarde, Chalmers Street and Liverpool Road.

To the west of this were Church Lands, declared in 1823 to support clergy in the colony, which extended into present day Flemington. In 1841 this was sold and the part south of Barker Road was acquired by Joseph Newton. The grant was sold to Samuel Terry in 1824 and he renamed it Redmyre Estate. The name Redmire (changed  to Redmyre) honoured a village in North Yorkshire, England, which was near the birthplace of the Terry family.

In 1885 the area was incorporated as Strathfield. This new name came from the name of a mansion (Strathfieldsaye) built in the district by John Hardie, a wealthy early settler, who chose the name to honour the English estate (Stratfield Saye) given in 1817 by a grateful nation to the Duke of Wellington.

Railway station
The first section of public railway line built in NSW was from Redfern station to Parramatta station on 26 September 1855. This line passed through the area now known as Strathfield. No station was provided at Strathfield, the closest stations were Burwood station and Homebush station.

The first station at Strathfield was named "Redmyre" and opened as a "halt" on 9 September 1876. It was renamed Strathfield on 8 March 1885. The first use of the present name "Strathfield" was adopted on 8 March 1886 and was named after the mansion Strathfield House, owned by James Hardy. Strathfield station came into prominence with the construction of the Main Northern line, which had its junction off the Western line at Strathfield. The first section to Hornsby station opened on 17 September 1886. Four platforms were provided, two for the Western line and two for the Northern line. A new mechanical signal box was built on the down-side behind the down western platform, this was the first signal box at Strathfield. A station was built on a new site in 1900, and yet again in 1922. The line was quadruplicated between 1891 and 1892, causing track alterations and requiring the construction of a pedestrian subway at the western end of the station to connect all platforms.

The 1900 platforms, overhead station building and road bridge were demolished and the present four-island platforms were built, giving a total of eight platforms. Access to these was now via a centrally located pedestrian subway and ramps. A short Parcels Platform was also built on the down side of the Down Local Line at the Sydney end. The land required for the extra platforms was reclaimed from The Boulevard and Clarendon Street (Albert Road).

As part of the electrification of the Sydney network, the station was rebuilt, opening on 7 March 1927. This included an overpass to take the Main Northern line over the Main Suburban line. In addition, a platform and building was erected at the southern end of platform eight which provided a mortuary receiving facility. This was subsequently converted to a store for the railway refreshment room on the station.

As part of reconstruction of the station area and for the future electrification of the western and northern rail lines a new Power Signal Box was built at Strathfield. This (the third signal box) was located on the Down side parallel to the Down Local at the country end of the station. It was built on a resumed, triangular block of land bounded by the Main Western Line to its north and Clarendon Street (Albert Road) to its south. The power signal box was the third signal box erected at Strathfield, the previous two signal boxes becoming "mechanical signal boxes". Strathfield power signal box controlled all train movements from the Sydney side of Wentworth Road overbridge (east), through Strathfield platforms and the tracks to the north and west of the flyover at the country end.

When the line from Strathfield to Hornsby was completed in the 1920s, Strathfield became the junction of all trains going north and west - an important rail junction.

In 1982, as part of the upgrading and modernising of the suburban signalling system the Strathfield power signal box was close to being replaced by the new Strathfield Signal Box complex located at Homebush incorporating a Relay Based Route Locking Signalling System. The new complex also replaced signal boxes at Ashfield, North Strathfield, Concord West, Homebush, Flemington Car Sidings, Flemington Goods Junction and Lidcombe.

Strathfield continues to be a busy and important junction station with the signalling complex at Homebush being the second largest signal box in the Sydney Metropolitan area.

Rail traffic in the Strathfield area has been controlled from Strathfield signal box, which is actually situated at Homebush, since 1983. Signalling at Strathfield is controlled by an entrance-exit (NX) route control panel with an early automatic route setting (ARS) system, which was manufactured by Westinghouse in the United Kingdom. This system is connected to double light colour light signals and electro-pneumatic switch machines on the ground. The 1926-vintage power box, which had a Westinghouse miniature lever frame, still stands to the west end of platform 8.

Strathfield substation
In 1927, the section of the suburban line to Strathfield was electrified, and at this time the Strathfield Substation was built. The Substation came into use on 27 August 1928, and was one of the 15 electrical substations built in the Sydney area between 1926 and 1932.

The Strathfield Substation was replaced by a new installation to the north of the original building. After this, the substation was converted to a fabrication workshop for signalling equipment, and has been used since 1990 by the Signal Branch to house its workshop. When this occurred, a modern extension was added to its south wing, removing the area on that side where the outdoor transformers were formerly located. At this time, the building was modified internally also, with offices added at the mezzanine level, a new crane installed on the original crane tracks and floor areas altered.

Intercity route changes
The expansion of Strathfield into a major suburban, intercity and interstate interchange was a factor in the popularity of Strathfield as a residential suburb for the colony's - later the state's - business and political elite. For example, Prime Minister Earle Page chose to buy a home in Strathfield because of its direct services to Melbourne, then the seat of federal parliament, and his electorate on the north coast of New South Wales. When the federal capital moved to Canberra, direct services from Strathfield extended there. Other prime ministers of the early 20th century who lived near Strathfield station included George Reid and Frank Forde (in Strathfield), Billy Hughes (in Homebush) and William McMahon (in Burwood). However, in 2013, with the upgrading of the East Hills line, intercity trains heading southwest to Canberra and Melbourne from Sydney Central began to use that line, leaving only intercity trains to the north and west to continue using Strathfield station.

Platforms and services

Transport links

Busways operates one route from Strathfield station:
 525: to Parramatta station via Olympic Park

Punchbowl Bus Company operates one route via Strathfield station:
 450: to Hurstville

Transdev NSW operates three routes via Strathfield station:
 913: to Bankstown station via Roberts Road & Chullora
 914: to Greenacre
 M90: Burwood to Liverpool station via Bankstown station

Transit Systems operate seven routes via Strathfield station:
 407: to Burwood via Strathfield West
 408: Rookwood Cemetery to Burwood via Flemington station
 415: Campsie station to Chiswick
 458: Ryde to Burwood
 480: to Central station via Homebush Road, Ashfield and Parramatta Road
 483: to Central station via Wallis Avenue, Ashfield and Parramatta Road 
 526: Burwood to Rhodes Shopping Centre via Newington and Olympic Park wharf

Strathfield station is served by four NightRide routes:
 N50: Liverpool station to Town Hall station
 N60: Fairfield station to Town Hall station
 N61: Carlingford station to Town Hall station
 N80: Hornsby station to Town Hall station

Heritage listing 
The listed station complex and associated infrastructure comprises a type 18, cast iron and timber building with 1-8 platforms, erected in 1927; cast iron and timber platform awnings for platforms 1-8, also erected in 1927; a brick and fibro gambrel roof power box that served as a former signal box, also erected in 1927; a brick parcels room and platform on the down local line; and a substation in triangle. Other major structures include a brick pedestrian subway at the Sydney end of the station, erected in 1927; ramps to all platforms with brick walls, also erected in 1927; and a pedestrian subway at the west end, under all tracks, also erected in 1927. Landscaped works include a brick wall opposite platform 1 on the up main loop.

Strathfield is a superb example of a large station that presents a coherent and uniform set of structures. It is the only example of the large awning structure station without on-platform buildings. It is located at a major junction with eight platforms and an elaborate subway system to service them. The quality of the platform structures is high and represents technological achievement that was compatible with design in Britain at the time. The structure uses decorative elements in the columns with plinths and capitals, elegant curved brackets, patterned fascias and being on a curve, presents an elegant and refined structure.

The former signal box is one of a few surviving large power boxes that adds to the station group and is significant in its own right.

The parcels office is a good example of a freestanding standard structure, very few of which survive.

Strathfield railway station was listed on the New South Wales State Heritage Register on 2 April 1999 having satisfied the following criteria.

The place possesses uncommon, rare or endangered aspects of the cultural or natural history of New South Wales.

This item is assessed as historically rare. This item is assessed as archaeologically rare. This item is assessed as socially rare.

The heritage listing of the Strathfield Railway Station group of structures includes the Strathfield Triangle, Strathfield Flyover and Strathfield Underbridges railway structures nearby.

See also 

 List of railway stations in Sydney
 Strathfield rail underbridges

References

Bibliography

Attribution

External links
 
 Strathfield station details Transport for New South Wales
 Strathfield Station Public Transport Map Transport for NSW

New South Wales State Heritage Register
Easy Access railway stations in Sydney
Railway stations in Sydney
Railway stations in Australia opened in 1876
Railway stations in Australia opened in 1922
Strathfield, New South Wales
Main North railway line, New South Wales
Main Suburban railway line